The tiger (Panthera tigris) is the largest living cat species and a member of the genus Panthera. It is most recognisable for its dark vertical stripes on orange fur with a white underside. An apex predator, it primarily preys on ungulates, such as deer and wild boar. It is territorial and generally a solitary but social predator, requiring large contiguous areas of habitat to support its requirements for prey and rearing of its offspring. Tiger cubs stay with their mother for about two years and then become independent, leaving their mother's home range to establish their own.

The tiger was first scientifically described in 1758. It once ranged widely from the Eastern Anatolia Region in the west to the Amur River basin in the east, and in the south from the foothills of the Himalayas to Bali in the Sunda Islands. Since the early 20th century, tiger populations have lost at least 93% of their historic range and have been extirpated from Western and Central Asia, the islands of Java and Bali, and in large areas of Southeast and South Asia and China. What remains of the range where tigers still roam free is fragmented, stretching in spots from Siberian temperate forests to subtropical and tropical forests on the Indian subcontinent, Indochina and a single Indonesian island, Sumatra.

The tiger is listed as Endangered on the IUCN Red List. As of 2015, the global wild tiger population was estimated to number between 3,062 and 3,948 mature individuals, with most populations living in small isolated pockets. India currently hosts the largest tiger population. Major reasons for population decline are habitat destruction, habitat fragmentation and poaching. Tigers are also victims of human–wildlife conflict, due to encroachment in countries with a high human population density.

The tiger is among the most recognisable and popular of the world's charismatic megafauna. It featured prominently in the ancient mythology and folklore of cultures throughout its historic range and continues to be depicted in modern films and literature, appearing on many flags, coats of arms and as mascots for sporting teams. The tiger is the national animal of India, Bangladesh, Malaysia and South Korea.

Etymology 
The Middle English tigre and Old English tigras derive from Old French tigre, from Latin tigris. This was a borrowing of Classical Greek τίγρις 'tigris', a foreign borrowing of unknown origin meaning 'tiger' and the river Tigris. The origin may have been the Persian word tigra ('pointed or sharp') and the Avestan word tigrhi ('arrow'), perhaps referring to the speed of the tiger's leap, although these words are not known to have any meanings associated with tigers.

The generic name Panthera is derived from the Latin word panthera and the Ancient Greek word πάνθηρ ('panther').

Taxonomy 
In 1758, Carl Linnaeus described the tiger in his work Systema Naturae and gave it the scientific name Felis tigris. In 1929, the British taxonomist Reginald Innes Pocock subordinated the species under the genus Panthera using the scientific name Panthera tigris.

Subspecies 

Following Linnaeus's first descriptions of the species, several tiger specimens were described and proposed as subspecies. The validity of several tiger subspecies was questioned in 1999. Most putative subspecies described in the 19th and 20th centuries were distinguished on basis of fur length and colouration, striping patterns and body size, hence characteristics that vary widely within populations. Morphologically, tigers from different regions vary little, and gene flow between populations in those regions is considered to have been possible during the Pleistocene. Therefore, it was proposed to recognize only two tiger subspecies as valid, namely P. t. tigris in mainland Asia, and P. t. sondaica in the Greater Sunda Islands.

This two-subspecies proposal was reaffirmed in 2015 by a comprehensive analysis of morphological, ecological and molecular traits of all putative tiger subspecies using a combined approach. The authors proposed recognition of only two subspecies, namely P. t. tigris comprising the Bengal, Malayan, Indochinese, South Chinese, Siberian and Caspian tiger populations of continental Asia, and P. t. sondaica comprising the Javan, Bali and Sumatran tiger populations of the Sunda Islands. The continental nominate subspecies P. t. tigris constitutes two clades: a northern clade composed of the Siberian and Caspian tiger populations, and a southern clade composed of all other mainland populations.

The authors of the 2015 study noted that this two-subspecies reclassification will affect tiger conservation management. It would make captive breeding programs and future re-wilding of zoo-born tigers easier, as one tiger population could then be used to bolster the population of another population. However, there is the risk that the loss of subspecies uniqueness could negatively impact protection efforts for specific populations.

In 2017, the Cat Classification Task Force of the IUCN Cat Specialist Group revised felid taxonomy in accordance with the two-subspecies proposal of the comprehensive 2015 study, and recognized the tiger populations in continental Asia as P. t. tigris, and those in the Sunda Islands as P. t. sondaica.

This two-subspecies view is still disputed by researchers, since the currently recognized nine subspecies can be distinguished genetically. Results of a 2018 whole-genome sequencing of 32 specimens support six monophyletic tiger clades corresponding with the living subspecies and indicate that the most recent common ancestor lived about 110,000 years ago.

The following tables are based on the classification of the species Panthera tigris provided in Mammal Species of the World, and also reflect the classification used by the Cat Classification Task Force in 2017:

Evolution 

The tiger's closest living relatives were previously thought to be the Panthera species lion, leopard and jaguar. Results of genetic analysis indicate that about 2.88 million years ago, the tiger and the snow leopard lineages diverged from the other Panthera species, and that both may be more closely related to each other than to the lion, leopard and jaguar. The geographic origin of the Panthera is most likely northern Central Asia. The tiger–snow leopard lineage dispersed in Southeast Asia during the Miocene.

Panthera zdanskyi is considered to be a sister taxon of the modern tiger. It lived at the beginning of the Pleistocene about two million years ago, its fossil remains were excavated in Gansu of northwestern China. It was smaller and more "primitive", but functionally and ecologically similar to the modern tiger. It is disputed as to whether it had the striping pattern. Northwestern China is thought to be the origin of the tiger lineage. Tigers grew in size, possibly in response to adaptive radiations of prey species like deer and bovids, which may have occurred in Southeast Asia during the Early Pleistocene.

The Wanhsien, Ngandong, Trinil, and Japanese tigers became extinct in prehistoric times. Tigers reached India and northern Asia in the late Pleistocene, reaching eastern Beringia, Japan, and Sakhalin. Some fossil skulls are morphologically distinct from lion skulls, which could indicate tiger presence in Alaska during the last glacial period, about 100,000 years ago.

Fossil teeth and bones found in Borneo were attributed to the Bornean tiger and date to about 13,745 to 3,000 years ago. It may have accessed Borneo, when the sea level was low during a glaciation period, and may have survived until about 200 years ago.
In the Ille Cave on the island of Palawan, two articulated phalanx bones were found amidst an assemblage of other animal bones and stone tools. They were smaller than mainland tiger fossils, possibly due to insular dwarfism. It has been speculated that the tiger parts were either imported from elsewhere, or that the tiger colonised Palawan from Borneo before the Holocene. Fossil remains of tigers were also excavated in Sri Lanka, China, Japan and Sarawak dating to the Late Pliocene, Pleistocene and Early Holocene.

Results of a phylogeographic study indicate that all living tigers had a common ancestor 108,000 to 72,000 years ago. The potential tiger range during the late Pleistocene and Holocene was predicted applying ecological niche modelling based on more than 500 tiger locality records combined with bioclimatic data. The resulting model shows a contiguous tiger range at the Last Glacial Maximum, indicating gene flow between tiger populations in mainland Asia. The tiger populations on the Sunda Islands and mainland Asia were possibly separated during interglacial periods.

The tiger's full genome sequence was published in 2013. It was found to have similar repeat composition to other cat genomes and an appreciably conserved synteny.

Hybrids 

Captive tigers were bred with lions to create hybrids called liger and tigon. They share physical and behavioural qualities of both parent species. Breeding hybrids is now discouraged due to the emphasis on conservation. The liger is a cross between a male lion and a tigress. Because the lion sire passes on a growth-promoting gene, but the corresponding growth-inhibiting gene from the female tiger is absent, ligers grow far larger than either parent species.

The less common tigon is a cross between a lioness and a male tiger. Because the male tiger does not pass on a growth-promoting gene and the lioness passes on a growth inhibiting gene, tigons are around the same size as their parents. Some females are fertile and have occasionally given birth to litigons when mated to a male Asiatic lion.

Description 

The tiger has a muscular body with strong forelimbs, a large head and a tail that is about half the length of its body. Its pelage colouration varies between shades of orange with a white underside and distinctive vertical black stripes; the patterns of which are unique in each individual. Stripes are likely advantageous for camouflage in vegetation such as long grass with strong vertical patterns of light and shade. The tiger is one of only a few striped cat species; it is not known why spotted patterns and rosettes are the more common camouflage pattern among felids. The orange colour may also aid in camouflage as the tiger's prey are dichromats, and thus may perceive the cat as green and blended in with the vegetation.

A tiger's coat pattern is still visible when it is shaved. This is not due to skin pigmentation, but to the stubble and hair follicles embedded in the skin. It has a mane-like heavy growth of fur around the neck and jaws and long whiskers, especially in males. The pupils are circular with yellow irises. The small, rounded ears have a prominent white spot on the back, surrounded by black. These spots are thought to play an important role in intraspecific communication.

The tiger's skull is similar to a lion's skull, with the frontal region usually less depressed or flattened, and a slightly longer postorbital region. The lion skull shows broader nasal openings. Due to the variation in skull sizes of the two species, the structure of the lower jaw is a reliable indicator for their identification.

Size 
There is notable sexual dimorphism between male and female tigers, with the latter being consistently smaller. The size difference between them is proportionally greater in the large tiger subspecies, with males weighing up to 1.7 times more than females. Males also have wider forepaw pads, enabling sex to be identified from tracks. It has been hypothesised that body size of different tiger populations may be correlated with climate and be explained by thermoregulation and Bergmann's rule, or by distribution and size of available prey species.

The Bengal and Siberian tigers are amongst the tallest cats in shoulder height. The tigers of the Sunda islands are smaller and less heavy than tigers in mainland Asia, rarely exceeding  in weight.

Colour variations 

There are three other colour variants – white, golden and nearly stripeless snow white – that are now virtually non-existent in the wild due to the reduction of wild tiger populations, but continue in captive populations. The white tiger has white fur and sepia-brown stripes. The golden tiger has a pale golden pelage with a blond tone and reddish-brown stripes. The snow white tiger is a morph with extremely faint stripes and a pale reddish-brown ringed tail.  Both snow white and golden tigers are homozygous for CORIN gene mutations.

The white tiger lacks pheomelanin (which creates the orange colour), and has dark sepia-brown stripes and blue eyes. This altered pigmentation is caused by a mutant gene that is inherited as an autosomal recessive trait, which is determined by a white locus. It is not an albino, as the dark pigments are scarcely affected. The mutation changes a single amino acid in the transporter protein SLC45A2. Both parents need to have the allele for whiteness to have white cubs. Between the early and mid 20th century, white tigers were recorded and shot in the Indian states of Odisha, Bihar, Assam and in the area of Rewa, Madhya Pradesh. The local maharaja started breeding tigers in the early 1950s and kept a white male tiger together with its normal-coloured daughter; they had white cubs. To preserve this recessive trait, only a few white individuals were used in captive breeding, which led to a high degree of inbreeding. Inbreeding depression is the main reason for many health problems of captive white tigers, including strabismus, stillbirth, deformities and premature death. Other physical defects include cleft palate and scoliosis.

The Tiger Species Survival Plan has condemned the breeding of white tigers, alleging they are of mixed ancestry and of unknown lineage. The genes responsible for white colouration are represented by 0.001% of the population. The disproportionate growth in numbers of white tigers points to inbreeding among homozygous recessive individuals. This would lead to inbreeding depression and loss of genetic variability.

There are also records of pseudo-melanic or black tigers which have thick stripes that merge. In Simlipal National Park, 37% of the tiger population has this condition, which has been linked to isolation and inbreeding.

Distribution and habitat 

The tiger historically ranged from eastern Turkey and Transcaucasia to the coast of the Sea of Japan, and from South Asia across Southeast Asia to the Indonesian islands of Sumatra, Java and Bali. Since the end of the last glacial period, it was probably restricted by periods of deep snow lasting longer than six months. Currently, it occurs in less than 6% of its historical range, as it has been extirpated from Southwest and Central Asia, large parts of Southeast and East Asia. It now mainly occurs in the Indian subcontinent, the Indochinese Peninsula, Sumatra and the Russian Far East. In China and Myanmar, breeding populations appear to rely on immigration from neighbouring countries while its status in the Korean Peninsula is unknown.

The tiger is essentially associated with forest habitats. Tiger populations thrive where populations of wild cervids, bovids and suids are stable. Records in Central Asia indicate that it occurred foremost in Tugay riverine forests along the Atrek, Amu Darya, Syr Darya, Hari, Chu and Ili Rivers and their tributaries. In the Caucasus, it inhabited hilly and lowland forests. Historical records in Iran are known only from the southern coast of the Caspian Sea and adjacent Alborz Mountains. In the Amur-Ussuri region, it inhabits Korean pine and temperate broadleaf and mixed forests, where riparian forests provide food and water, and serve as dispersal corridors for both tiger and ungulates. On the Indian subcontinent, it inhabits mainly tropical and subtropical moist broadleaf forests, moist evergreen forests, tropical dry forests and the swamp forests of the Sundarbans. In Myanmar, tigers are distributed across the country and among every province. The country is home to two tiger populations, Bengal and Indochinese tigers. In 1996, the composition of the two populations was 60% Bengal tigers and 40% Indochinese tigers. The natural ecological divide for these two populations is assumed to be the Irrawaddy River, but there is no scientific evidence for that hypothesis. DNA studies are needed to confirm it. Today, the presence of tigers was confirmed in the Hukawng Valley, Htamanthi Wildlife Sanctuary, and in two small areas in the Tanintharyi Region. The Tenasserim Hills is an important area, but forests are harvested there. In 2015, tigers were recorded by camera traps for the first time in the hill forests of Kayin State. In Thailand, it lives in deciduous and evergreen forests. In Laos, 14 tigers were documented in semi-evergreen and evergreen forest interspersed with grassland in Nam Et-Phou Louey National Protected Area during surveys from 2013 to 2017. In Sumatra, tiger populations range from lowland peat swamp forests to rugged montane forests.

Ecology and behaviour

Social and daily activities 
When not subject to human disturbance, the tiger is mainly diurnal. It does not often climb trees but cases have been recorded. It is a strong swimmer and often bathes in ponds, lakes and rivers, thus keeping cool in the heat of the day. During the 1980s, a tiger was observed frequently hunting prey through deep lake water in Ranthambhore National Park.

Radio-collared tigers in Chitwan National Park started dispersing from their natal areas earliest at the age of 19 months.

Adult tigers lead largely solitary lives. They establish and maintain territories but have much wider home ranges within which they roam. Resident adults of either sex generally confine their movements to their home ranges, within which they satisfy their needs and those of their growing cubs. Individuals sharing the same area are aware of each other's movements and activities. The size of the home range mainly depends on prey abundance, geographic area and sex of the individual.

Young female tigers establish their first territories close to their mother's. The overlap between the female and her mother's territory reduces with time. Males, however, migrate further than their female counterparts and set out at a younger age to mark out their own area. A young male acquires territory either by seeking out an area devoid of other male tigers, or by living as a transient in another male's territory until he is older and strong enough to challenge the resident male. Young males seeking to establish themselves thereby comprise the highest mortality rate (30–35% per year) amongst adult tigers.

To identify his territory, the male marks trees by spraying urine, anal gland secretions, marking trails with feces and marking trees or the ground with their claws. Females also use these "scrapes", urine and fecal markings. Scent markings of this type allow an individual to pick up information on another's identity, sex and reproductive status. Females in oestrus will signal their availability by scent marking more frequently and increasing their vocalisations.

Although for the most part avoiding each other, tigers are not always territorial and relationships between individuals can be complex. An adult of either sex will sometimes share its kill with others, even with unrelated tigers. George Schaller observed a male share a kill with two females and four cubs. Unlike male lions, male tigers allow females and cubs to feed on the kill before the male is finished with it; all involved generally seem to behave amicably, in contrast to the competitive behaviour shown by a lion pride. Stephen Mills described a social feeding event in Ranthambore National Park:

Male tigers are generally less tolerant of other males within their territories than females are of other females. Territory disputes are usually solved by intimidation rather than outright violence. Several such incidents have been observed in which the subordinate tiger yielded by rolling onto its back and showing its belly in a submissive posture. Once dominance has been established, a male may tolerate a subordinate within his range, as long as they do not live in too close quarters. The most serious disputes tend to occur between two males competing for a female in oestrus, sometimes fighting to the death.

Facial expressions include the "defense threat", where an individual bares its teeth, flattens its ears and its pupils enlarge. Both males and females show a flehmen response, a characteristic grimace, when sniffing urine markings, but flehmen is more often associated with males detecting the markings made by tigresses in oestrus. 

Tigers roar to signal their presence to other individuals over long distances. They may roar three or four times in a row, and other tigers may respond in kind. When tense, tigers will moan, a sound similar to a roar but softer and made when the mouth is at least partially closed. For aggressive encounters, tigers growl, snarl and hiss. During an attack, an explosive "coughing roar" or "coughing snarl" is emitted though an open mouth and exposed teeth. Chuffing—soft, low-frequency snorting similar to purring in smaller cats—is heard in more friendly situations. Other vocalizations include grunts, woofs and miaows.

Hunting and diet 

In the wild, tigers mostly feed on large and medium-sized mammals, particularly ungulates weighing . Range-wide, the most selected prey are  sambar deer, Manchurian wapiti, barasingha and wild boar. Tigers are capable of taking down larger prey like adult gaur and wild water buffalo, but will also opportunistically eat much smaller prey, such as monkeys, peafowl and other ground-based birds, hares, porcupines, and fish. They also prey on other predators, including dogs, leopards, bears, snakes and crocodiles. Tigers generally do not prey on fully grown adult Asian elephants and Indian rhinoceros but incidents have been reported. More often, it is the more vulnerable small calves that are taken. When in close proximity to humans, tigers will also sometimes prey on such domestic livestock as cattle, horses, and donkeys. Although almost exclusively carnivorous, tigers will occasionally eat vegetation for dietary fibre such as fruit of the slow match tree.

Tigers are thought to be mainly nocturnal predators, but in areas where humans are absent, remote-controlled, hidden camera traps recorded them hunting in daylight. They generally hunt alone and ambush their prey as most other cats do, overpowering them from any angle, using their body size and strength to knock the prey off balance. Successful hunts usually require the tiger to almost simultaneously leap onto its quarry, knock it over, and grab the throat or nape with its teeth. Despite their large size, tigers can reach speeds of about  but only in short bursts; consequently, tigers must be close to their prey before they break cover. If the prey senses the tiger's presence before this, the tiger usually abandons the hunt rather than give chase or battle pre-alerted prey. Horizontal leaps of up to  have been reported, although leaps of around half this distance are more typical. One in 2 to 20 hunts, including stalking near potential prey, ends in a successful kill.

When hunting larger animals, tigers prefer to bite the throat and use their powerful forelimbs to hold onto the prey, often simultaneously wrestling it to the ground. The tiger remains latched onto the neck until its target dies of strangulation. By this method, gaurs and water buffaloes weighing over a ton have been killed by tigers weighing about a sixth as much. Although they can kill healthy adults, tigers often select the calves or infirm of very large species. Healthy adult prey of this type can be dangerous to tackle, as long, strong horns, legs and tusks are all potentially fatal to the tiger. No other extant land predator routinely takes on prey this large on its own.

With small prey such as monkeys and hares, the tiger bites the nape, often breaking the spinal cord, piercing the windpipe, or severing the jugular vein or common carotid artery. Rarely, tigers have been observed to kill prey by swiping with their paws, which are powerful enough to smash the skulls of domestic cattle, and break the backs of sloth bears.

After killing their prey, tigers sometimes drag it to conceal it in vegetation, grasping with their mouths at the site of the killing bite. This, too, can require great physical strength. When 13 men simultaneously tried to drag the same carcass later, they were unable to move it. In captivity, adult tigers are fed  of meat a day.

Enemies and competitors 

Tigers usually prefer to eat self-killed prey, but eat carrion in times of scarcity and also steal prey from other large carnivores. Although predators typically avoid one another, if a prize is under dispute or a serious competitor is encountered, displays of aggression are common. If these fail, the conflicts may turn violent; tigers may kill or even prey on competitors such as leopards, dholes, striped hyenas, wolves, bears, pythons, and mugger crocodiles on occasion. Crocodiles, bears, and large packs of dholes may win conflicts with tigers, and crocodiles and bears can even kill them.

The considerably smaller leopard avoids competition from tigers by hunting at different times of the day and hunting different prey. In India's Nagarhole National Park, most prey selected by leopards were from  against a preference for heavier prey by tigers. The average prey weight in the two respective big cats in India was  against . With relatively abundant prey, tigers and leopards were seen to successfully coexist without competitive exclusion or interspecies dominance hierarchies that may be more common to the African savanna, where the leopard lives beside the lion. Golden jackals may scavenge on tiger kills. Tigers appear to inhabit the deep parts of a forest while smaller predators like leopards and dholes are pushed closer to the fringes.

Reproduction and life cycle 

The tiger mates all year round, but most cubs are born between March and June, with a second peak in September. Gestation ranges from 93 to 114 days, with an average of 103 to 105 days. A female is only receptive for three to six days. Mating is frequent and noisy during that time. The female gives birth in a sheltered location such as in tall grass, in a dense thicket, cave or rocky crevice. The father generally takes no part in rearing. Litters consist of two or three cubs, rarely as many as six. Cubs weigh from  each at birth, and are born with eyes closed. They open their eyes when they are six to 14 days old. Their milk teeth break through at the age of about two weeks. They start to eat meat at the age of eight weeks. At around this time, females usually shift them to a new den. They make short ventures with their mother, although they do not travel with her as she roams her territory until they are older.  Females lactate for five to six months. Around the time they are weaned, they start to accompany their mother on territorial walks and are taught how to hunt.

A dominant cub emerges in most litters, usually a male. The dominant cub is more active than its siblings and takes the lead in their play, eventually leaving its mother and becoming independent earlier. The cubs start hunting on their own earliest at the age of 11 months, and become independent around 18 to 20 months of age. They separate from their mother at the age of two to two and a half years, but continue to grow until the age of five years. Young females reach sexual maturity at three to four years, whereas males at four to five years. Unrelated wandering male tigers often kill cubs to make the female receptive, since the tigress may give birth to another litter within five months if the cubs of the previous litter are lost. The mortality rate of tiger cubs is about 50% in the first two years. Few other predators attack tiger cubs due to the diligence and ferocity of the mother. Apart from humans and other tigers, common causes of cub mortality are starvation, freezing, and accidents. Generation length of the tiger is about eight years. The oldest recorded captive tiger lived for 26 years.

Occasionally, male tigers participate in raising cubs, usually their own, but this is extremely rare and not always well understood. In May 2015, Amur tigers were photographed by camera traps in the Sikhote-Alin Nature Reserve. The photos show a male Amur tiger pass by, followed by a female and three cubs within the span of about two minutes. In Ranthambore, a male Bengal tiger raised and defended two orphaned female cubs after their mother had died of illness. The cubs remained under his care, he supplied them with food, protected them from his rival and sister, and apparently also trained them.

Conservation 

In the 1990s, a new approach to tiger conservation was developed: Tiger Conservation Units (TCUs), which are blocks of habitat that have the potential to host tiger populations in 15 habitat types within five bioregions. Altogether 143 TCUs were identified and prioritized based on size and integrity of habitat, poaching pressure and population status.

In 2016, an estimate of a global wild tiger population of approximately 3,890 individuals was presented during the Third Asia Ministerial Conference on Tiger Conservation. The WWF subsequently declared that the world's count of wild tigers had risen for the first time in a century.

Major threats to the tiger include habitat destruction, habitat fragmentation and poaching for fur and body parts, which have simultaneously greatly reduced tiger populations in the wild. In India, only 11% of the historical tiger habitat remains due to habitat fragmentation. Demand for tiger parts for use in traditional Chinese medicine has also been cited as a major threat to tiger populations. Some estimates suggest that there are fewer than 2,500 mature breeding individuals, with no subpopulation containing more than 250 mature breeding individuals.

India is home to the world's largest population of wild tigers. A 2014 census estimated a population of 2,226, a 30% increase since 2011. On International Tiger Day 2019, the 'Tiger Estimation Report 2018' was released by Prime Minister Narendra Modi. The report estimates a population of 2967 tigers in India with 25% increase since 2014. Modi said "India is one of the safest habitats for tigers as it has achieved the target of doubling the tiger population from 1411 in 2011 to 2967 in 2019". As of 2022, India accounts for 75 percent of global tiger population.

In 1973, India's Project Tiger, started by Indira Gandhi, established numerous tiger reserves. The project was credited with tripling the number of wild Bengal tigers from some 1,200 in 1973 to over 3,500 in the 1990s, but a 2007 census showed that numbers had dropped back to about 1,400 tigers because of poaching. Following the report, the Indian government pledged $153 million to the initiative, set up measures to combat poaching, promised funds to relocate up to 200,000 villagers in order to reduce human-tiger interactions, and set up eight new tiger reserves in India . India also reintroduced tigers to the Sariska Tiger Reserve and by 2009 it was claimed that poaching had been effectively countered at Ranthambore National Park.

In the 1940s, the Siberian tiger was on the brink of extinction with only about 40 animals remaining in the wild in Russia. As a result, anti-poaching controls were put in place by the Soviet Union and a network of protected zones (zapovedniks) were instituted, leading to a rise in the population to several hundred. Poaching again became a problem in the 1990s, when the economy of Russia collapsed. The major obstacle in preserving the species is the enormous territory individual tigers require, up to  needed by a single female and more for a single male. Current conservation efforts are led by local governments and NGO's in concert with international organisations, such as the World Wide Fund for Nature and the Wildlife Conservation Society. The competitive exclusion of wolves by tigers has been used by Russian conservationists to convince hunters to tolerate the big cats. Tigers have less impact on ungulate populations than do wolves, and are effective in controlling the latter's numbers. In 2005, there were thought to be about 360 animals in Russia, though these exhibited little genetic diversity. However, in a decade later, the Siberian tiger census was estimated from 480 to 540 individuals.

In China, tigers became the target of large-scale 'anti-pest' campaigns in the early 1950s, where suitable habitats were fragmented following deforestation and resettlement of people to rural areas, who hunted tigers and prey species. Though tiger hunting was prohibited in 1977, the population continued to decline and is considered extinct in southern China since 2001. Having earlier rejected the Western-led environmentalist movement, China changed its stance in the 1980s and became a party to the CITES treaty. By 1993 it had banned the trade in tiger parts, and this diminished the use of tiger bones in traditional Chinese medicine. The Tibetan people's trade in tiger skins has also been a threat to tigers. The pelts were used in clothing, tiger-skin chuba being worn as fashion. In 2006 the 14th Dalai Lama was persuaded to take up the issue. Since then there has been a change of attitude, with some Tibetans publicly burning their chubas.

In 1994, the Indonesian Sumatran Tiger Conservation Strategy addressed the potential crisis that tigers faced in Sumatra. The Sumatran Tiger Project (STP) was initiated in June 1995 in and around the Way Kambas National Park to ensure the long-term viability of wild Sumatran tigers and to accumulate data on tiger life-history characteristics vital for the management of wild populations. By August 1999, the teams of the STP had evaluated 52 sites of potential tiger habitat in Lampung Province, of which only 15 these were intact enough to contain tigers. In the framework of the STP a community-based conservation program was initiated to document the tiger-human dimension in the park to enable conservation authorities to resolve tiger-human conflicts based on a comprehensive database rather than anecdotes and opinions.

The Wildlife Conservation Society and Panthera Corporation formed the collaboration Tigers Forever, with field sites including the world's largest tiger reserve, the  Hukaung Valley in Myanmar.

Tigers have been studied in the wild using a variety of techniques. Tiger population have been estimated using plaster casts of their pugmarks, although this method was criticized as being inaccurate. More recent techniques include the use of camera traps and studies of DNA from tiger scat, while radio-collaring has been used to track tigers in the wild. Tiger spray has been found to be just as good, or better, as a source of DNA than scat.

Relationship with humans

Tiger hunting 

The tiger has been one of the most sought after game animals of Asia. Tiger hunting took place on a large scale in the early 19th and 20th centuries, being a recognised and admired sport by the British in colonial India, the maharajas and aristocratic class of the erstwhile princely states of pre-independence India. A single maharaja or English hunter could claim to kill over a hundred tigers in their hunting career. Over 80,000 tigers were slaughtered in just 50 years spanning from 1875 to 1925 in British-ruled India. Tiger hunting was done by some hunters on foot; others sat up on machans with a goat or buffalo tied out as bait; yet others on elephant-back. King George V on his visit to Colonial India in 1911 killed 39 tigers in a matter of 10 days One of these is on display at the Royal Albert Memorial Museum.

Historically, tigers have been hunted at a large scale so their famous striped skins could be collected. The trade in tiger skins peaked in the 1960s, just before international conservation efforts took effect. By 1977, a tiger skin in an English market was considered to be worth US$4,250.

Body part use 
Tiger parts are commonly used as amulets in South and Southeast Asia. In the Philippines, the fossils in Palawan were found besides stone tools. This, besides the evidence for cuts on the bones, and the use of fire, suggests that early humans had accumulated the bones, and the condition of the tiger subfossils, dated to approximately 12,000 to 9,000 years ago, differed from other fossils in the assemblage, dated to the Upper Paleolithic. The tiger subfossils showed longitudinal fracture of the cortical bone due to weathering, which suggests that they had post-mortem been exposed to light and air. Tiger canines were found in Ambangan sites dating to the 10th to 12th centuries in Butuan, Mindanao.

Many people in China and other parts of Asia have a belief that various tiger parts have medicinal properties, including as pain killers and aphrodisiacs. There is no scientific evidence to support these beliefs. The use of tiger parts in pharmaceutical drugs in China is already banned, and the government has made some offences in connection with tiger poaching punishable by death. Furthermore, all trade in tiger parts is illegal under the Convention on International Trade in Endangered Species of Wild Fauna and Flora and a domestic trade ban has been in place in China since 1993.

However, the trading of tiger parts in Asia has become a major black market industry and governmental and conservation attempts to stop it have been ineffective to date. Almost all black marketers engaged in the trade are based in China and have either been shipped and sold within in their own country or into Taiwan, South Korea or Japan. The Chinese subspecies was almost completely decimated by killing for commerce due to both the parts and skin trades in the 1950s through the 1970s. Contributing to the illegal trade, there are a number of tiger farms in the country specialising in breeding them for profit. It is estimated that between 5,000 and 10,000 captive-bred, semi-tame animals live in these farms today. However, many tigers for traditional medicine black market are wild ones shot or snared by poachers and may be caught anywhere in the tiger's remaining range (from Siberia to India to the Malay Peninsula to Sumatra). In the Asian black market, a tiger penis can be worth the equivalent of around $300 U.S. dollars. In the years of 1990 through 1992, 27 million products with tiger derivatives were found. In July 2014 at an international convention on endangered species in Geneva, Switzerland, a Chinese representative admitted for the first time his government was aware trading in tiger skins was occurring in China.

Man-eating tigers 

Wild tigers that have had no prior contact with humans actively avoid interactions with them. However, tigers cause more human deaths through direct attack than any other wild mammal. Attacks are occasionally provoked, as tigers lash out after being injured while they themselves are hunted. Attacks can be provoked accidentally, as when a human surprises a tiger or inadvertently comes between a mother and her young, or as in a case in rural India when a postman startled a tiger, used to seeing him on foot, by riding a bicycle. Occasionally tigers come to view people as prey. Such attacks are most common in areas where population growth, logging, and farming have put pressure on tiger habitats and reduced their wild prey. Most man-eating tigers are old, missing teeth, and unable to capture their preferred prey. For example, the Champawat Tiger, a tigress found in Nepal and then India, had two broken canines. She was responsible for an estimated 430 human deaths, the most attacks known to be perpetrated by a single wild animal, by the time she was shot in 1907 by Jim Corbett. According to Corbett, tiger attacks on humans are normally in daytime, when people are working outdoors and are not keeping watch. Early writings tend to describe man-eating tigers as cowardly because of their ambush tactics.

Man-eaters have been a particular problem in recent decades in India and Bangladesh, especially in Kumaon, Garhwal and the Sundarbans mangrove swamps of Bengal, where some healthy tigers have hunted humans. Because of rapid habitat loss attributed to climate change, tiger attacks have increased in the Sundarbans. The Sundarbans area had 129 human deaths from tigers from 1969 to 1971. In the 10 years prior to that period, about 100 attacks per year in the Sundarbans, with a high of around 430 in some years of the 1960s. Unusually, in some years in the Sundarbans, more humans are killed by tigers than vice versa. In 1972, India's production of honey and beeswax dropped by 50% when at least 29 people who gathered these materials were devoured. In 1986 in the Sundarbans, since tigers almost always attack from the rear, masks with human faces were worn on the back of the head, on the theory that tigers usually do not attack if seen by their prey. This decreased the number of attacks only temporarily. All other means to prevent attacks, such as providing more prey or using electrified human dummies, did not work as well.

In captivity 

In Ancient Roman times, tigers were kept in menageries and amphitheatres to be exhibited, trained and paraded, and were often provoked to fight gladiators and other exotic beasts. Since the 17th century, tigers, being rare and ferocious, were sought after to keep at European castles as symbols of their owners' power. Tigers became central zoo and circus exhibits in the 18th century: a tiger could cost up to 4,000 francs in France (for comparison, a professor of the Beaux-Arts at Lyons earned only 3,000 francs a year), or up to $3,500 in the United States, where a lion cost no more than $1,000.

In 2007, over 4,000 captive tigers lived in China, of which 3,000 were held by about 20 larger facilities, with the rest held by some 200 smaller facilities. In 2011, 468 facilities in the USA kept 2,884 tigers. Nineteen US states banned private ownership of tigers, fifteen require a license, and sixteen states have no regulation. Genetic ancestry of 105 captive tigers from fourteen countries and regions showed that forty-nine animals belonged distinctly to five subspecies; fifty-two animals had mixed subspecies origins. Many Siberian tigers in zoos today are actually the result of crosses with Bengal tigers.

Cultural depictions 

Tigers and their superlative qualities have been a source of fascination for mankind since ancient times, and they are routinely visible as important cultural and media motifs. They are also considered one of the charismatic megafauna, and are used as the face of conservation campaigns worldwide. In a 2004 online poll conducted by cable television channel Animal Planet, involving more than 50,000 viewers from 73 countries, the tiger was voted the world's favourite animal with 21% of the vote, narrowly beating the dog.

Mythology and legend 

In Chinese mythology and culture, the tiger is one of the 12 animals of the Chinese zodiac. In Chinese art, the tiger is depicted as an earth symbol and equal rival of the Chinese dragon – the two representing matter and spirit respectively. The Southern Chinese martial art Hung Ga is based on the movements of the tiger and the crane. In Imperial China, a tiger was the personification of war and often represented the highest army general (or present day defense secretary), while the emperor and empress were represented by a dragon and phoenix, respectively. The White Tiger is one of the Four Symbols of the Chinese constellations. It is sometimes called the White Tiger of the West, and it represents the west and the autumn season.

The tiger's tail appears in stories from countries including China and Korea, it being generally inadvisable to grasp a tiger by the tail. In Korean myth and culture, the tiger is regarded as a guardian that drives away evil spirits and a sacred creature that brings good luck – the symbol of courage and absolute power. For the people who live in and around the forests of Korea, the tiger considered the symbol of the Mountain Spirit or King of mountain animals. So, Koreans also called the tigers "San Gun" (산군) means Mountain Lord.

In Buddhism, the tiger is one of the Three Senseless Creatures, symbolising anger, with the monkey representing greed and the deer lovesickness. The Tungusic peoples considered the Siberian tiger a near-deity and often referred to it as "Grandfather" or "Old man". The Udege and Nanai called it "Amba". The Manchu considered the Siberian tiger as "Hu Lin," the king. In Hinduism, the god Shiva wears and sits on tiger skin. The ten-armed warrior goddess Durga rides the tigress (or lioness) Damon into battle. In southern India the god Ayyappan was associated with a tiger. Dingu-Aneni is the god in North-East India is also associated with tiger. The weretiger replaces the werewolf in shapeshifting folklore in Asia; in India they were evil sorcerers, while in Indonesia and Malaysia they were somewhat more benign. In Greco-Roman tradition, the tiger was depicted being ridden by the god Dionysus.

Literature and media 

In the Hindu epic Mahabharata, the tiger is fiercer and more ruthless than the lion. William Blake's poem in his Songs of Experience (1794), titled "The Tyger", portrays the tiger as a menacing and fearful animal. In Rudyard Kipling's 1894 The Jungle Book, the tiger Shere Khan is the mortal enemy of the human protagonist Mowgli. Yann Martel's 2001 Booker Prize winning novel Life of Pi, features the title character surviving shipwreck for months on a small boat with a large Bengal tiger while avoiding being eaten. The story was adapted in Ang Lee's 2012 feature film of the same name.

Friendly tiger characters include Tigger in A. A. Milne's Winnie-the-Pooh and Hobbes of the comic strip Calvin and Hobbes, both represented as stuffed animals come to life. Tony the Tiger is a famous mascot for Kellogg's breakfast cereal Frosted Flakes, known for his catchphrase "They're Gr-r-reat!".

Heraldry and emblems 

The tiger is one of the animals displayed on the Pashupati seal of the Indus Valley civilisation. The tiger was the emblem of the Chola Dynasty and was depicted on coins, seals and banners. The seals of several Chola copper coins show the tiger, the Pandyan emblem fish and the Chera emblem bow, indicating that the Cholas had achieved political supremacy over the latter two dynasties. Gold coins found in Kavilayadavalli in the Nellore district of Andhra Pradesh have motifs of the tiger, bow and some indistinct marks. The tiger symbol of Chola Empire was later adopted by the Liberation Tigers of Tamil Eelam and the tiger became a symbol of the unrecognised state of Tamil Eelam and Tamil independence movement. The Bengal tiger is the national animal of India and Bangladesh. The Malaysian tiger is the national animal of Malaysia. The Siberian tiger is the national animal of South Korea. The Tiger is featured on the logo of the Delhi Capitals IPL team.

In European heraldry, the tyger, a depiction of a tiger as imagined by European artists, is among the creatures used in charges and supporters. This creature has several notable differences from real tigers, lacking stripes and having a leonine tufted tail and a head terminating in large, pointed jaws. A more realistic tiger entered the heraldic armory through the British Empire's expansion into Asia, and is referred to as the Bengal tiger to distinguish it from its older counterpart. The Bengal tiger is not a common creature in heraldry, but is used as a supporter in the arms of Bombay and emblazoned on the shield of the University of Madras.

See also 
 Siegfried & Roy, two famous tamers of tigers
 List of largest cats
 Tiger King, a 2020 crime documentary series on the exotic pet trade
 Tiger versus lion

References

Further reading

External links 
 
 
 
 
 

Apex predators
Big cats
Conservation-reliant species
EDGE species
Extant Pleistocene first appearances
Fauna of South Asia
Fauna of Southeast Asia
Felids of Asia
Mammals described in 1758
Mammals of East Asia
National symbols of India
National symbols of Bangladesh
National symbols of Malaysia
National symbols of Singapore
Panthera
Species endangered by agricultural development
Species endangered by deliberate extirpation efforts
Species endangered by human consumption for medicinal or magical purposes
Species endangered by logging
Species endangered by urbanization
Taxa named by Carl Linnaeus